Nitria (also called the Mountain of Nitria or Petoou Mpihosm in Greek and Latin sources) is one of the earliest Christian monastic sites in Egypt and is located in the Nitrian Desert. It was the first of the three major centers of Christian monastic activity in the Lower Egypt, the other two being Kellia and Scetis.

History 

Nitria was founded in c. 325-330 by Amoun of Nitria and quickly attracted thousands of monks through the remainder of the 4th century. By 390, it had evolved from a loose collection of solitary monks to an organized settlement of multiple cenobitic monasteries, and included bankers, merchants, and sellers. Jerome, who visited Nitria in 386, said that it had over five-thousand monks. Palladius of Galatia, who lived there in 390, gave a similar estimate in his Lausaic History.

Christian pilgrims from the nearby city of Alexandria visited Nitria in large numbers, the monks servicing their needs. Other monks sought more remote areas, away from tourists and merchants, and established a monastic center in Kellia c. 338.

The monastic population in Nitria declined during the fifth and sixth centuries, and the site was abandoned sometime in the middle of the seventh century. Nitria should not be confused with the monasteries at Wadi El Natrun (formally known as Scetis), which are still in existence.

Onomatology 
Nitria was named after a nearby town which took its name from the natural deposits of natron, a salt used by the Ancient Egyptians in the embalming of mummies. The English and German word "natron" was first a French cognate which has its origin from the Spanish "natrón" through Latin "natrium" and Greek "nitron" (νίτρον). This root derives from the Ancient Egyptian word "nṯrj". Natron refers to Wadi El Natrun (English: Natron Valley) in Egypt, where natron salt was mined by the ancient Copts and Egyptians. Natron was also used for washing garments. This led to the symbolism that Nitria is where men's sins were washed away.

Although Nitria is often called the Mountain of Nitria, there is little geographical elevation difference between Nitria and the surrounding region. It was likely called this referring to Matthew 5:14 where Jesus describes his followers as being a "city on a hill".

Location 

The ancient site of Nitria was located by the archaeologist Hugh Evelyn-White (1884-1924) sometime between 1917 and 1922. It is located approximately 13.7 Kilometers southwest of Damanhur by the village of Al Barnuji, 19.3 Kilometers from Kellia, and about 50 Kilometers south of Alexandria. The coordinates of Nitria are 30.928651°N, 30.385628°E. Nitria is not as far in the desert at Scetis, and according to Historia Monachorum in Aegypto, it takes 24 hours to walk from Nitria to Scetis.

List 
Partial list of monks who inhabited Nitria.

 Or of Nitria
 Serapion of Nitria
 Amoun of Nitria
 Cronius of Nitria
 Anthony the Great
 Bessarion of Egypt
 Chaeremon of Nitria
 The Tall Brothers
 Isaac of the Cells
 John of Egypt
 Macarius of Alexandria
 Macarius of Egypt
 Albianos
 Pambo
 Pishoy
 Sisoes the Great
 Ammonas of Egypt

See also 

 Desert Fathers
 Eastern Orthodox Church

References

External links
Map of Al Barnuji, via Google Maps. Note the natron lake one kilometer to the south. 
Nitria and Kellia, maps and information.

Coptic settlements
Archaeological sites in Egypt
Former populated places in Egypt